The Diocese of Pinsk is a Latin Church ecclesiastical territory or diocese in Belarus. It is a suffragan diocese in the ecclesiastical province of the metropolitan Archdiocese of Minsk-Mohilev.

Its cathedral is a minor basilica: the Cathedral Basilica of the Assumption of the Virgin Mary, in the episcopal see of Pinsk.

History 
 28 October 1925: Established as Diocese of Pinsk/Пінская (Беларуская)/Pinsken(sis) Latinorum (Latin adjective), on territory split off from the then Diocese of Minsk (which also provided its first incumbent by transfer)
 Lost territory on 1991.06.05 to establish the Diocese of Drohiczyn.

Statistics 
, it pastorally served 41,500 Catholics (1.3% of 3,109,000 total) on 72,700 km² in 79 parishes with 52 priests (30 diocesan, 22 religious), 76 lay religious (32 brothers, 44 sisters) and 8 seminarians.

Episcopal ordinaries
Bishops of Pinsk 
 Zygmunt Łoziński (1925.10.28 – death 1932.03.26), previously Bishop of Minsk (Belarus) (1917.11.02 – 1925.10.28)
 Kazimierz Bukraba (1932.07.10 – death 1946.05.06)
Apostolic Administrator Władysław Jędruszuk (1967.02.16 – 1991.06.05), while Auxiliary Bishop of Pinsk (1962.11.19 – 1991.06.05) and Titular Bishop of Clysma (1962.11.19 – 1991.06.05); later Bishop of Drohiczyn (Poland) (1991.06.05 – death 1994.05.25)
Apostolic Administrator Kazimierz Świątek (Казімір Свёнтэк) (1991.04.13 - 2011.06.30) while Metropolitan Archbishop of Minsk-Mohilev (Belarus) (1991.04.13 – retired 2006.06.14), created Cardinal-Priest of S. Gerardo Maiella (1994.11.26 – death 2011.07.21), President of Catholic Episcopal Conference of Belarus (1999.02.11 – 2006.06.14)
Apostolic Administrator Tadeusz Kondrusiewicz (2011.06.30 - 2012.06.16) while Metropolitan Archbishop of Minsk-Mohilev (Belarus) (2007.09.21 – ...), Vice-President of Catholic Episcopal Conference of Belarus (2006? – 2015.06.03); previously Titular Bishop of Hippo Diarrhytus (1989.05.10 – 2002.02.11) as Apostolic Administrator of Minsk (Belarus) (1989.05.10 – 1991.04.13), Apostolic Administrator of Northern European Russia (Russia) (1991.04.13 – 2002.02.11), President of Conference of Catholic Bishops of Russia (1999 – 2005), Metropolitan Archbishop of (Mother of God at) Moscow (Russia) (2002.02.11 – 2007.09.21); later President of Catholic Episcopal Conference of Belarus (2015.06.03 – ...)
 Antoni Dziemianko (2012.06.16 - ... ), previously Titular Bishop of Lesvi (1998.07.04 – 2012.05.03) as Auxiliary Bishop of Diocese of Grodno (Belarus) (1998.07.04 – 2004.12.14) and as Auxiliary Bishop of Archdiocese of Minsk-Mohilev (Belarus) (2004.12.14 – 2012.05.03), Secretary General of Catholic Episcopal Conference of Belarus (2006? – 2015.06.03), Apostolic Administrator of Archdiocese of Minsk-Mohilev (Belarus) (2006.06.14 – 2007.09.21).

See also 
 List of Catholic dioceses in Belarus
 the former Ruthenian Catholic Archeparchy of Polotsk–Vitebsk
 Roman Catholicism in Belarus

Sources and external links 
 GCatholic.org - data for all sections
 Catholic Hierarchy

Roman Catholic dioceses in Belarus
Religious organizations established in 1925
Roman Catholic dioceses and prelatures established in the 20th century